Jeep Arena is a 2,741-seat basketball arena in Vilnius, Lithuania, built next to Avia Solutions Group Arena. Rytas Vilnius play the Lithuanian Basketball League's home matches in the arena.

In 2014, its capacity was expanded from 1,700 seats to 2,500 seats with the aim to host EuroCup games.

Tenants
More important or highly anticipated matches in the LKL, as well as all home fixtures in European competitions (such as the EuroLeague or EuroCup), are played in the Avia Solutions Group Arena. Women basketball team Kibirkštis Vilnius also plays in the arena. Past tenants include now dissolved Lithuanian and European women's basketball powerhouse Teo and Lietuvos Rytas daughter club Perlas Vilnius.

Name
Until 2018–19 LKL season it was known as the Lietuvos rytas Arena, when naming rights were sold to the Lietuvos rytas media group, title sponsor of arena's owners. After club was overtaken by new owners, the sponsorship was terminated and on 14 August 2018 the official name of the structure was changed to the Rytas basketball Arena. On 12 September 2019, the arena was renamed the Jeep Arena.

See also
 Avia Solutions Group Arena

References

Basketball venues in Lithuania
Sports venues in Vilnius
Sports venues completed in 2005
Indoor arenas in Lithuania
Šeškinė
2005 establishments in Lithuania
Basketball in Vilnius